Michael Riegler (born 17 July 1979 in Grabs, Switzerland) is a Liechtensteiner former alpine skier. He competed in the 2002 Winter Olympics in Salt Lake City, finishing 35th in the Giant slalom.

Riegler competed on the FIS Alpine Ski World Cup tour through 2002 to 2005. He also represented Liechtenstein at the 2003 and 2005 Alpine World Ski Championships in Giant slalom and Super G.  His most notable race win came at the 2004 National Championships in Innerkrems.

References

1979 births
Living people
Liechtenstein male alpine skiers
Olympic alpine skiers of Liechtenstein
Alpine skiers at the 2002 Winter Olympics
People from the canton of St. Gallen